The Henry and Caroline Schrage House, also known as the Schrage Mansion, is a historic structure located in Whiting, Indiana. It was built by Henry Schrage, a German immigrant, Union Civil War veteran, and a settler of Whiting’s Station. Schrage founded numerous businesses in Whiting, including the Bank of Whiting, today known as Centier Bank. It is listed on the National Register of Historic Places (100006562).

See also
 National Register of Historic Places listings in Indiana
 National Register of Historic Places listings in Lake County, Indiana

References

External links
 Whiting-Robertsdale Historical Society
 Centier Bank Opens Historical Museum Honoring Family, Corporate Roots in Whiting

Houses completed in 1897
Houses in Lake County, Indiana
Houses on the National Register of Historic Places in Indiana
National Register of Historic Places in Lake County, Indiana